Syrian Civil War
 Battle of Damascus (2012)
 Battle of Aleppo (2012)
 Timeline of the Syrian Civil War
 Cities and towns during the Syrian Civil War
 Syrian reactions to the Syrian Civil War
 Human rights violations during the Syrian Civil War
 Local coordination committees of Syria
 Syrian Kurdistan campaign (2012–present)
 Shabiha
 Sectarianism and minorities in the Syrian Civil War
 Refugees of the Syrian Civil War
 Casualties of the Syrian Civil War
 Politics of Syria
 List of freedom indices
 List of journalists killed during the Syrian Civil War
 Salim Idris

Armed groups
 List of armed groups in the Syrian Civil War

Pro-government forces
 Syrian Armed Forces
 Shabiha
 Syrian Resistance
 Jaysh al-Sha'bi
 National Defense Force (Syria)
 Popular Committees (Syria)
 Liwa Abu al-Fadhal al-Abbas
 Islamic Revolutionary Guard Corps
 Basij
 Hezbollah
 Popular Front for the Liberation of Palestine – General Command
 Houthis
 Promised Day Brigades
 Asa'ib Ahl al-Haq
 Badr Organization
 Kata'ib Hezbollah
 Syrian Social Nationalist Party
 Popular Nasserist Organization

Opposition forces
 Islamic Front (Syria)
 Syrian Islamic Liberation Front
 Suqour al-Sham Brigade
 Jaysh al-Islam
 Al-Tawhid Brigade
 Ahfad al-Rasul Brigade
 Farouq Brigades
 Syrian Islamic Front
 Ahrar ash-Sham
 Free Syrian Army
 Syrian Martyrs' Brigade
 Syrian Turkmen Brigades
 Liwaa al-Umma
 al-Qaeda
 al-Nusra Front
 Islamic State of Iraq and Syria
 Tehrik-i-Taliban Pakistan
 Jaish al-Muhajireen wal-Ansar
 Fatah al-Islam
 Ghuraba al-Sham (Syria)
 Ghuraba al-Sham (jihadist group)
 Syria Martyrs' Brigade
 Abdullah Azzam Shaheed Brigade
 Jund al-Sham
 Muslim Brotherhood of Syria
 Future Movement
 Free Iraqi Army

Foreign involvement
 Kofi Annan peace plan for Syria
 International reactions to the Syrian Civil War
 Foreign rebel fighters in the Syrian Civil War
 Russia's role in the Syrian Civil War
 Foreign involvement in the Syrian Civil War
 Iranian support for Syria in the Syrian Civil War
 Iran–Syria relations
 Russia–Syria relations
 Syria–United States relations
 Saudi Arabia–Syria relations
 Syria–Turkey relations
 France–Syria relations

Articles
Syrian Civil War